Lubogoszcz may refer to the following places:
Lubogoszcz, Krosno Odrzańskie County in Lubusz Voivodeship (west Poland)
Lubogoszcz, Wschowa County in Lubusz Voivodeship (west Poland)
Lubogoszcz, West Pomeranian Voivodeship (north-west Poland)